is a Japanese voice actor who is the voice of Ultraman Tiga as well as the voices of Appule and Daizu in Dragon Ball Z. His real name is , and he works for Aoni Production.

He is also the Japanese voice of Tommy Oliver in Mighty Morphin Power Rangers the Movie.

Filmography

Television animation
Dragon Quest (1989) (Hargon)
Dragon Ball Z (1990) (Appule)
Pretty Soldier Sailor Moon (1992) (Kenji Tsukino)
Anpanman (1994) as Hyōtan-kun
Grander Musashi (1997) (Takehiro Kazama)
Seiyu's Life! (2015) (himself)

OVA
Legend of the Galactic Heroes (1991) (Drewentz)
Sohryuden: Legend of the Dragon Kings (1993) (Meuron)
Phantom Quest Corp. (1994) (Sano)

Theatrical animation
Dragon Ball Z: The Tree of Might (1990) (Daizu)
Slam Dunk Movie 2 (1994) (Tomokazu Godai)
Detective Conan: The Lost Ship in the Sky (2010) (Masaki Mizukawa)

Tokusatsu
Ultraman Tiga (1996) (Ultraman Tiga)
Ultraman Dyna (1997) (Narrator)
Ultraman Retsuden (2011) (Narrator)

Dubbing roles
Ghostbusters II (1992 Fuji TV edition) (Egon Spengler (Harold Ramis))
Kansas (Wade (Andrew McCarthy))
Mighty Morphin Power Rangers: The Movie (Tommy Oliver/White Power Ranger (Jason David Frank))
Mystery Date (James Lew (BD Wong))
New Superman (Jimmy)
Nine Months (Arnie (Charles Martinet))
Seven (1998 Fuji TV edition) (Detective Mills (Brad Pitt))
The Shawshank Redemption (Tommy Williams (Gil Bellows))
Young Guns II (1995 Fuji TV edition) ('Arkansas' Dave Rudabaugh (Christian Slater))

Others
News Japan (1994–2015) (Narrator)
Sanma no Super Karakuri TV (1996–2014) (Narrator)
Waratte Koraete  (1996–present) (Narrator)
Ainori (1999–2009) (Narrator)
Himitsu no Kenmin Show (2006–present) (Narrator)
Jōhō 7days (2008–present) (Narrator)

References

External links

1962 births
Living people
Male voice actors from Kanagawa Prefecture
Voice actors from Kawasaki, Kanagawa
Japanese male voice actors
Aoni Production voice actors